Bayan may refer to:

Eduational Institutions
 Bayan Islamic Graduate School, Chicago, IL

Places
Bayan-Aul, Pavlodar, Kazakhstan
Bayan Mountain, an ancient mountain name for part of Tarbagatai Mountains at Kazakhstan in Qing Dynasty period
Bayan Lepas, place in Penang, Malaysia which also houses Penang airport
Bayan Baru, a place in Penang, Malaysia ( next to Bayan Lepas )
Bayan, Dashkasan, Azerbaijan
Bayan, Oghuz, Azerbaijan
 Bayan County, in Harbin city, Heilongjiang Province, China
 Bayan or Piyan, an old name for Khorramshahr, Iran
 Bayan, Fars, a village in Fars Province, Iran
 Bayan, Hamadan, a village in Hamadan Province, Iran
 Bayan area an area within the Hawalli governorate of Kuwait

 Bayan (political entity), the historic term for a Country or Polity in early Philippine history; used today to describe a municipality, or to denote one's homeland or country.
 Bayan, Sistan and Baluchestan, a village in Sistan and Baluchestan Province, Iran
 Bayan, Bayat

Mongolia 
Bayan (rich, wealth) is a common place name element in both Mongolia and Inner Mongolia:

 two Aimags (provinces) of Mongolia:
Bayan-Ölgii Province, the westernmost of the 21 aimags (provinces) of Mongolia
Bayankhongor Province, one of the 21 aimags (provinces) of Mongolia
 Bayankhongor, the capital of Bayankhongor Aimag
 two Düüregs (districts) of the capital Ulan Bator:
Bayangol
Bayanzürkh
 many Sums (districts) in different Aimags:
Bayan, Töv
Bayan-Adarga, Khentii
Bayan-Agt, Bulgan
Bayanbulag, Bayankhongor
Bayanchandmani, Töv
Bayandalai, Ömnögovi
Bayandelger, Sükhbaatar, a sum (district) of Sükhbaatar Province in eastern Mongolia
Bayandelger, Töv
Bayandun, Dornod
Bayangol, Övörkhangai
Bayangol, Selenge
Bayangovi, Bayankhongor
Bayanlig, Bayankhongor
Bayanjargalan, Dundgovi
Bayanjargalan, Töv
Bayankhairkhan, Zavkhan
Bayankhangai, Töv
Bayankhutag, Khentii
Bayanmönkh, Khentii
Bayannuur, Bulgan
Bayannuur, Bayan-Ölgii
Bayan-Öndör, Bayankhongor
Bayan-Öndör, Orkhon
Bayan-Öndör, Övörkhangai
Bayan-Önjüül, Töv
Bayan-Ovoo, Bayankhongor
Bayan-Ovoo, Khentii, a sum (district) of Khentii Province in eastern Mongolia
Bayan-Ovoo, Ömnögovi
Bayantal, Govisümber
Bayantes, Zavkhan
Bayantsagaan, Bayankhongor
Bayantsagaan, Töv
Bayantsogt, Töv
Bayantümen, Dornod
Baruun Bayan-Ulaan, Övörkhangai
Züünbayan-Ulaan, Övörkhangai
Bayan-Uul, Dornod
Bayan-Uul, Govi-Altai
Uulbayan, Sükhbaatar
Bayanzürkh, Khövsgöl, a sum (district) of Khövsgöl aimag (province)
 Bayanzag or Flaming Cliffs, a paleontological site in the Gobi desert

Inner Mongolia

 Bayannur prefecture-level city

 Bayan Obo, mining settlement in Baotou

Family Name
 Bayan, the variant source of family name Fu (富), meaning "rich or wealth", whom dwell in Aohan Banner

People

 two Mongol generals of the Yuan Dynasty:
Bayan of the Baarin (1236–1295) and
Bayan of the Merkid (died 1340), Mongol general of the Mergid clan and official in the Yuan Dynasty
 Buyan (khan), aka Bayan, the Khan of the Blue Horde
 Bayan I (6th-century–602), Avar khagan
 Bayan II (died 617), Avar khagan
 Bayan (son of Kubrat), son of Kubrat Khan
 Bayan Mahmoud Al-Zahran, Saudi lawyer

Music
Bayan, the larger drum of the tabla set
 Bayan (accordion), Russian accordion

Media
Al Bayan (newspaper), a newspaper in the Arab Emirates
Al Bayan, an Iraqi newspaper affiliated to the Islamic Dawa Party
 Al Bayan (magazine), a Lebanese business magazine
 Al-Bayan (journal), a 19th-century periodical in Cairo
 Al-Bayan (radio station), an Iraq-based radio station of ISIS
 Bayan Telecommunications, a major telecommunications carrier in the Philippines
 Bayan Productions, a co-production of ABS-CBN, which is produced by Trip na Trip, Kabuhayang Swak na Swak and Urban Zone

Religious books
The Bayán, meaning exposition, is a set of two books written by the Báb around 1848:
Persian Bayán, written in Persian
Arabic Bayán, written in Arabic

Social and political groups

 Bayan Muna, a leftist political party in the Philippines

Military
 Bayan-class cruiser, a class of armored cruisers of Imperial Russian Navy
The Russian cruiser Bayan (1900), namesake of the class

Other 

 Al Bayan Holding Group

See also
 Bhajan, an Indian devotional song
 Bajan (disambiguation)
 Bayani (disambiguation)